The 1990–91 season was Colchester United's 49th season in their history and their first season outside of the Football League for 40 years following relegation from the Fourth Division the season prior. Now competing in the Conference, the fifth tier of English football and the highest level on non-League football in England, the club also participated in the FA Cup, the FA Trophy and the Bob Lord Trophy.

Ian Atkins took over from Mick Mills as manager for Colchester's first season in the Conference. The club remained fully professional in their bid to return to the Football League at the first attempt. They fell agonisingly short, just two-points shy of champions and promoted Barnet.

Colchester were knocked out by Leyton Orient in the second round of the FA Cup. They reached the quarter-final of the FA Trophy, losing to Witton Albion, while they also suffered defeat to Sutton United in the Bob Lord Trophy.

Season overview
Ian Atkins was appointed as the manager charged with returning Colchester United to the Football League at the first attempt, like Lincoln City and Darlington had prior to them. Atkins registered as a player, while the club reinstated its historic navy and white striped kits. To help clear club debts, Layer Road was sold back to the Council for £1.2m with the club leasing it back for a maximum of three seasons.

Colchester started the season with a 100 percent record from their opening six home games, but it took the U's until April to reach top spot in the Conference table. Both Barnet and Kettering Town were Colchester's main title challengers throughout the season.

In the FA Cup, United were dispatched by League opposition Leyton Orient following a 0–0 draw at Layer Road. The O's beat the U's 4–1 at Brisbane Road. Colchester reached the quarter-final of the FA Trophy in their first time playing in the competition, beaten by Witton Albion. In the Bob Lord Trophy, Sutton United saw off Colchester in the third round of the competition.

In the closing weeks of the Conference season, Layer Road attracted a season record 7,221 crowd for the visit of late promotion pushers Altrincham. The U's could only manage a 1–1 draw, and with Barnet improving on Colchester's results until the close of the season pipped United to the Conference title by two points.

Chairman Jonathan Crisp was left fuming:

During the summer he left the club, handing over to new chairman James Bowdidge, while Atkins also left the club to rejoin Birmingham City as player-assistant manager.

Players

Transfers

In

 Total spending:  ~ £67,000

Out

 Total incoming:  ~ £50,000

Loans in

Loans out

Match details

Pre-season friendly

Conference

League table

Results round by round

Matches

FA Cup

FA Trophy

Bob Lord Trophy

Squad statistics

Appearances and goals

|-
!colspan="14"|Players who appeared for Colchester who left during the season

|}

Goalscorers

Disciplinary record

Clean sheets
Number of games goalkeepers kept a clean sheet.

Player debuts
Players making their first-team Colchester United debut in a fully competitive match.

See also
List of Colchester United F.C. seasons

References

General
Books

Specific

1990-91
English football clubs 1990–91 season